Trischidocera is a genus of flies in the family Tachinidae. The genus is currently unplaced within Tachinidae according to Silvo S. Nihei (2015); it had previously been placed in tribes such as Germariini and Ormiini.

Species
 Trischidocera sauteri Villeneuve, 1915
 Trischidocera yunnanensis Chao & Zhou, 1987

References

Tachinidae
Tachinidae genera
Diptera of Asia
Taxa named by Joseph Villeneuve de Janti